Bergsbyn is a locality situated in Skellefteå Municipality, Västerbotten County, Sweden with 1,780 inhabitants in 2010.

References 

Populated places in Västerbotten County
Populated places in Skellefteå Municipality